Parliamentary elections were held in the Federated States of Micronesia on 5 March 2013 for the 10 seats in the Congress elected for a two-year term. A total of 21 candidates ran for election. Three MPs were elected unopposed.

Results

References

Elections in the Federated States of Micronesia
2013 elections in Oceania
Parliamentary election
Non-partisan elections